Roelof Petrus Meyer GCOB (born 16 July 1947) is a South African politician and businessman. Originally a member of the National Party, he is known for his prominent role in the negotiations to end the apartheid system in South Africa. He later co-founded the United Democratic Movement.

Early life and education
Meyer, the youngest son of Eastern Cape farmer, Hudson Meyer and school teacher Hannah Meyer, née van Heerden, attended school in Ficksburg and studied law at the University of the Free State, where he completed B Comm (1968) and LLB (1971) degrees. At university, he was president of the conservative "Afrikaanse Studentebond". During his compulsory military service, he was a member of the SADF choir also known as the "Kanaries". Meyer then practised as a lawyer in Pretoria and Johannesburg until 1980.

Politics

In 1979, he entered politics as he was elected as a Member of Parliament for the National Party in the Johannesburg West constituency. In 1986, he became Deputy Minister of Law and Order and in 1988, of Constitutional Development (until 1991). With the declaration of the first State of Emergency in 1985, the National Joint Management Centre (NJMC), chaired by the Deputy Minister of Law and Order, took over as the nerve centre for co-ordination of all welfare and security policies.

In 1991, State President F. W. De Klerk appointed him Minister of Defence as successor to Magnus Malan. Allegedly, the "verligte Nat" ("liberal" or "enlightened" NP politician) couldn't win the respect of the generals in this position. In May 1992, after nine months in office, he resigned and became Minister of Constitutional Affairs and Communication as successor to Gerrit Viljoen. It was in this position that he entered the negotiating process. He also became the chairman of the Beleidsgroep vir Hervorming (Policy Group for Reform).

Negotiations to end apartheid 
Meyer became famous in his position as the government's chief negotiator in the Multiparty Negotiating Forum 1993 after the failure of CODESA where he established an amicable and effective relationship with the ANC’s chief negotiator, Cyril Ramaphosa. In this role, he worked closely with Niel Barnard, who was head of the National Intelligence Service and a strong supporter of a negotiated settlement. After the conclusion of the negotiations in November 1993, he became the government's chief representative in the Transitional Executive Council (TEC). Meyer and Ramaphosa received the South African Breweries Leadership and Service Award in 2004.

After the multi-racial elections in April 1994, Meyer became Minister of Constitutional Development and Provincial Affairs in the government of national unity of the new President, Nelson Mandela. His elder brother Anthon "Tobie" Meyer was Deputy Minister for Agriculture and Land Affairs in this government. He worked once more with Cyril Ramaphosa, who was chairperson of the Constitutional Assembly.

Meyer resigned from the cabinet in 1996 and became Secretary-General of the National Party. 1996-97 he was also Chairman of the NP in Gauteng. After the new constitution was negotiated and ratified, the National Party withdrew from the government. He then tried to bring about a reorientation of his party but failed due to the resistance of the conservative wing around Hernus Kriel. Meyer eventually resigned from the National Party, and consequently his seat in Parliament, in 1997.

United Democratic Movement 
After he left the National Party, he became, with former Transkeian leader Bantu Holomisa, the co-founder of the United Democratic Movement (UDM).  In the elections of 1999 the UDM received fourteen seats in Parliament and Meyer served as the Deputy President of the party until his retirement from politics in 2000. In 2006 he announced that he would join the ANC.

After politics
Since 2000 Meyer has held a number of local and international positions, including a membership of the Strategy Committee of the Project on Justice in Times of Transition at Tufts University in the USA. He also became the Chairman of the Civil Society Initiative (CSI) of South Africa.
Meyer also uses his experience to act as a consultant on international peace processes and negotiations, for example in Northern Ireland, Rwanda and Kosovo.

Meyer was awarded the "Order of the Baobab in Silver" by the Republic of South Africa for "his immense contribution in providing special support in the birth of the new democratic South Africa through negotiations".

From 2012 to 2014 he chaired the Defence Review Committee.

In 2013 Meyer co-founded the non-profit pro-democracy organisation In Transformation Initiative. The organisation has been involved in the South African land issue, as well as facilitating the development of a constitution for Sri Lanka.

Awards 
He was awarded the Order of the Baobab, Silver; for "His immense contribution in providing special support in the birth of the new democratic South Africa through negotiations and ensuring that South Africa has a Constitution that protects all its citizens."

References

External links
About his life and career

See also
Negotiations to end apartheid in South Africa
History of South Africa

1947 births
African National Congress politicians
Afrikaner people
Defence ministers of South Africa
Living people
Members of the House of Assembly (South Africa)
Members of the National Assembly of South Africa
National Party (South Africa) politicians
People from Port Elizabeth
United Democratic Movement (South Africa) politicians
University of the Free State alumni
Order of the Baobab